The Immigration Act of 1903, also called the Anarchist Exclusion Act, was a law of the United States regulating immigration. It codified previous immigration law, and added four inadmissible classes: anarchists, people with epilepsy, beggars, and importers of prostitutes. It had minimal impact and its provisions related to anarchists were expanded in the Immigration Act of 1918.

Background 

Anarchism came to public attention in the United States with the Haymarket Affair of 1886. On May 4, a policeman was killed and several others were wounded, of which six later died, after a bomb exploded in Chicago's Haymarket Square. Eight members of the recently formed International Working People's Association (IWPA) were found guilty of the bombing. The IWPA's 1883 manifesto called for the "destruction of the existing class rule, by all means, i.e., by energetic, relentless, revolutionary and international action".

The idea of excluding anarchists from immigrating was first mentioned at a Congressional hearing in 1889. A bill introduced on July 20, 1894 sought to restrict the entry of anarchists by requiring potential immigrants to visit a U. S. consulate for a political review before immigrating. A substitute bill proposed a system within the United States to detect, question, and deport immigrants accused of anarchism. Both died in committee.

On September 6, 1901, Leon F. Czolgosz, an American-born son of Polish immigrants and a self-proclaimed anarchist, assassinated President William McKinley. The police responded by arresting a number of anarchists, including Emma Goldman and a group of Chicago anarchists that published Free Society, the leading English-language Communist-anarchist periodical in the U.S. at the time. They were all later released because no evidence of conspiracy could be found. And there were some viewpoints in the anarchist opinion which strongly denounced Czolgosz, some calling him a "dangerous crank", despite what was to come next.

Theodore Roosevelt urged the exclusion and deportation of anarchist immigrants in his first address to Congress on December 3, 1901:

Legislation 

President Theodore Roosevelt signed the Act, officially "An Act To regulate the immigration of aliens into the United States", ch. 1012, into law on March 3, 1903, the last day of the 57th United States Congress. It codified previous immigration law and added four inadmissible classes: anarchists, people with epilepsy, beggars, and importers of prostitutes. It also allowed for the deportation within two years of anyone unlawfully in the country and raised the head tax on immigrants to the United States to two dollars ($2.00). It further allowed the deportation of immigrants who became a public charge within their first two years in the country.

This was the first legislation in the U.S. since the Alien and Sedition Acts of 1798 that called for questioning potential immigrants about their political beliefs. The Act barred anyone "who disbelieves in or who is opposed to all organized government, or who is a member of or affiliated with any organization entertaining or teaching such disbelief in or opposition to all organized government." The law also limited the deportation of non-citizen anarchists to the first three years of their residency in the United States.

Enforcement 

The impact of the law was slight. The Commissioner-General of Immigration reported that from the time the law took effect in 1903 until June 30, 1914, a total of 15 anarchists were denied entry to the U.S. He reported that four anarchists were expelled in 1913 and three in 1914.

In October 1903, immediately following a speech given by Scottish anarchist John Turner at the Murray Hill Lyceum in New York, Bureau of Immigration officials arrested him and found a copy of Johann Most's Free Society and Turner's speaking schedule, which included a memorial to the Haymarket Martyrs. This was enough evidence to order his deportation. Emma Goldman organized a Free Speech League to contest the deportation. She recruited Clarence Darrow and Edgar Lee Masters to defend him. After Goldman organized a meeting at Cooper Union of those opposing the deportation, a New York Times editorial argued in favor of the Act and the deportation of Turner. It referred to the people at the meeting as "ignorant and half-crazy dreamers" and declared that it was the country's "right - in the belief of Congress and of many, probably of most, Americans', it makes it our duty - to exclude him."

Darrow and Masters presented their defense of Turner before the U.S. Supreme Court. They argued that the law was unconstitutional and that Turner was merely a "philosophical anarchist" and therefore not a threat to the government. Chief Justice Melville Fuller wrote the Court's decision holding that the Bill of Rights does not apply to aliens and that Congress had the right to deny entry to anyone they deemed a threat to the country. Turner became the first person deported under the act.

Amendment 

The Act was re-enacted on June 29, 1906.

Advocates for using the immigration laws to combat radicalism campaigned to expand the law's definitions of those who could be excluded or deported. Immigration officials complained about the law's limitation on deportation to the first three years of an immigrant's residency: 

The anarchist of foreign birth ... remains very quiet, as a rule, until the time limit protects him from deportation and then he is loud and boisterous and begins his maniac cry against all forms of organized government. ... There should be no time limit to the deportation of these criminals ... and should one remain in hiding sufficiently long to become naturalized he should, at the first symptoms, be shorn of his cloak and forthwith deported.

The 1903 Act was amended by the Immigration Act of 1918, which expanded and elaborated the brief definition of anarchist found in the 1903 Act and enhanced the government's ability to deport adherents of anarchism.

See also 
Page Act of 1875

Notes

Sources 
Paul Avrich, Sacco and Vanzetti: The Anarchist Background (Princeton: Princeton University Press, 1991)
John Chalberg, Emma Goldman: American Individualist (NY: Harper Collins, 1991), 
Sidney Fine, "Anarchism and the Assassination of McKinley", American Historical Review, vol. LX, no. 4 (July 1955)
Bill Ong Hing, Defining America Through Immigration Policy (Philadelphia: Temple University Press, 2004)
Edward P. Hutchinson, Legislative History of American Immigration Policy (Philadelphia: University of Pennsylvania Press, 1981)
Frederick Van Dyne, Citizenship of the United States (Lawyers' Co-operative Publishing, 1904), available online, 

1903 in American law
Ableism
Anti-anarchism in the United States
Epilepsy
History of anarchism
Political repression in the United States
Prostitution in the United States
United States federal immigration and nationality legislation
United States immigration law